Martin Zobel (born 25 February 1957 in Tallinn) is an Estonian plant ecologist and professor at the University of Tartu. His name is particularly associated with the idea of an impact of regional species diversity on diversity at smaller spatial scales – known as the species pool effect. He has been professor since 1992. He has served as Editor-in-Chief of the scientific journal Ecography.

Selected scientific works
Zobel, M. (1984) Экология и динамика прибрежных альварных растительных сообществ Эстонской ССР (Ecology and dynamics of coastal alvar plant communities in Estonia). Biol.Kand. thesis, University of Tartu.
Zobel, M. (1997) The relative role of species pools in determining plant species richness: an alternative explanation of species coexistence. Trends in Ecology & Evolution 12: 266-269.
Zobel, M., Otsus, M., Liira, J., Moora, M. & Möls, T. (2000) Is small-scale species richness limited by seed availability or microsite availability? Ecology 81: 3274-3282.

Personal life
His father was architecture historian Rein Zobel and his brother is biologist Kristjan Zobel.

External links
 Home page

Estonian ecologists
University of Tartu alumni
Academic staff of the University of Tartu
Living people
1957 births
Plant ecologists
People from Tallinn